Brain Quest 3 & 4 is an educational video game released for Nintendo DS in North America on September 22, 2008.  The game was released at the same time as Brain Quest Grades 5 & 6.  Staying true to the curriculum-based card deck series Brain Quest, it contains over 6,000 unique questions, developed specifically for American third grade and fourth grade levels.

Reception 

Brain Quest Grades 3 & 4 received mixed to positive reviews upon release.

References

External links
 GameSpot Summary

2008 video games
Electronic Arts games
Nintendo DS games
Nintendo DS-only games
Planet Moon Studios games
Puzzle video games
Video games based on works
Video games developed in the United States